Sukshinder Shinda (born Sukshinder Pal Singh Bhullar, Punjabi: ਸੁਖਸ਼ਿੰਦਰ ਸਿੰਘ ਭੁੱਲਰ) is a British-Indian playback singer-songwriter and bhangra Record producer from Handsworth in Birmingham, England. Since releasing his first professional recording in 1993, Dhol Beat Ek, Shinda has produced or collaborated on more than 200 albums, including all of Jazzy B's releases and the majority of Amrinder Gill's.

Awards
In 2006, Sukshinder Shinda won two awards at the UK Asian Music Awards (UKAMA), "Best Album" and "Best Video". In 2008, he won another two awards at the UK Asian Music Awards, "Best Act" and "Best Album" for Living the Dream. In 2010, he won "Best Producer" at the UKAMA. He also won "Best Producer" at the Brit Asia TV Music Awards (BAMA), where he also won "Best Video" for "Ghum Sum". In 2011 he was nominated for Best Album (for Jadoo), Best Producer, Best Male Act and Best Desi Act and ended up winning only Best Producer. In 2012 he won "Best Dressed Act" at the BAMA.

Discography

Religious Discography

Singles

Production discography

Filmography

See also 

 List of British Sikhs

References

External links
One In A Million Video Press Release
Official Website
Sukshinder Shinda Biography

Bhangra (music)
English Sikhs
People from Handsworth, West Midlands
Living people
English people of Indian descent
Punjabi people
1972 births